Metjen (also read as Methen) was an ancient Egyptian high official at the transition time from 3rd Dynasty to 4th Dynasty. He is famous for his tomb inscription, which provide that he worked and lived under the kings (pharaohs) Huni and Sneferu.

Identity

Family 

According to his own tomb inscriptions, Metjen was a son of the high official Inpu-em-Ankh, a judge at the royal court of justice and a royal scribe. Metjen's mother was a high priestess named Neb-senet. Metjen also had children, which he indirectly mentions, but their names are not handed down.

Titles 
As a high-ranking official, Metjen bore several elite titularies:
 Confidant of the king (Egyptian: Rekh-neswt). A title that allowed Metjen to receive audiences at the pharaoh.
 Great one of the 'ten of Upper Egypt''' (Egyptian: Wer-medi-shemaw). The exact meaning of this title is unknown, some scholars believe it designated the royal court of justice.
 Privy council (Egyptian: Sa'ab). Significantly, there is next to nothing known about this office, but it must have been one of the most wanted curatorial and political posts of that era (right after the title "Great one of the 'ten of Upper Egypt').
 Administrator of Hat-mehyt (Egyptian: Adj-mer Hat-mehyt). 
 Administrator of Khepesh (Egyptian: Adj-mer Khepesh). The reading of the last sign is uncertain, but it must designate a certain nome.
 Administrator of the Khasuu-nome (Egyptian: Adj-mer-khasuu).
 Curator of the endowment estate of king Huni in the Khepesh nome (Egyptian: Heqa-hwt-Huni-khepesh). The exact geographical location of the estate is unknown, but it is mentioned on the famous Palermo stone.
 Curator of the Ka-house of queen Nimaathapi (Egyptian: Heqa-hwt-ka-Nimaathapi).

 Career 
Metjen's tomb inscriptions are of the highest interest to Egyptologists and historians alike. They are in fact the very first Ancient Egyptian private texts that reveal more than only titles and offering formulae. Metjen is the first high official who reports his own professional and curatorial career by listing his official and honorary titles in chronological order and describing the support of his career by his parents.

According to Metjen's autobiography, he inherited many of his titles after the death of his father, other high ranked titles were assigned to him by his father himself. The inheritance included also several decrees which allowed Metjen to found his own estates and even small towns. Metjen started as a royal scribe, then became overseer of the royal scribes and confidant of the king, then he became administrator of several palatinates and royal storages. Finally, he became "great one of the 'Ten of Upper Egypt'" and privy council. Additionally, the royal house gave several estates to Metjen, whereupon he founded the town Sheret-Metjen (Egyptian: Šr.t-Mṯn) at his favorite estate. As a sign of gratitude, Metjen in turn donated hundreds of precious trees to royal domains. At the peak of his career, Metjen was also mayor of several cities, curator of the endowment estate of king Huni and supervisor of the mortuary cult for queen Nimaathapi.

Contemporary office partners included Netjeraperef, Khabawsokar, Pehernefer and Akhetaa, who were also holding office under Huni and Sneferu. All their tomb inscriptions reveal that the time of both kings must have been a very prosperous one; and economy and office administration flourished.

 Tomb 
Metjen's tomb, mastaba L6'', was found in 1842 by German Egyptologist Carl Richard Lepsius at Saqqara. He excavated the tomb and ordered the dismantling of the tomb for preservation. Metjen's tomb chapels are now completely on display at the Egyptian Museum of Berlin. Here was also found the Statue of Metjen.

References 

People of the Third Dynasty of Egypt
27th-century BC people